Wrestle Like a Girl is a non-profit founded by Olympic wrestler Sally Roberts, focused on empowering girls and women through increasing opportunities in female wrestling.

History
Wrestle Like a Girl was originally founded in Colorado by Sally Roberts to provide resources for women seeking to wrestle in college.  Roberts was a three-time U.S. National Champion, two-time World bronze medal winner, and a veteran of the War in Afghanistan.

Advocacy
Wrestle Like a Girl has petitioned the NCAA to accept female wrestling as a sanctioned college sport.  The organization argues that being an NCAA sport would allow female wrestlers to receive scholarships, health insurance, and other benefits currently only available to male wrestlers.

Events
Wrestle Like a Girl directs wrestling camps for girls aged 5 to 18.  In 2018, WLAG partnered with UFC fighters Jessica-Rose Clark and Gina Mazany to host a wrestling clinic in Las Vegas, Nevada.

References

Women's sports organizations in the United States
Non-profit organizations based in Washington, D.C.
Sports organizations established in 2016
Wrestling in the United States